Muhamed Karamusić Nihadi (also spelled Mohammad Karamusić Nehādi; died 1587) was a Bosnian poet who lived and died in Sarajevo. Only one manuscript of Nihadi's divan is extant. It is stored in the German capital of Berlin, and was originally part of the belongings of Baron Heinrich Dietrich von Dietz, the Prussian ambassador in the Ottoman capital of Constantinople (modern-day Istanbul). Von Dietz was also an Orientalist and a collector of manuscripts. The manuscript of Nihadi's divan consists of ninety-four ghazals, of which eight are composed in Persian.

References

Date of birth unknown
1587 deaths
16th-century Persian-language poets
Bosnian Muslims from the Ottoman Empire
16th-century poets from the Ottoman Empire
Male poets from the Ottoman Empire
Bosnia and Herzegovina poets
16th-century Bosnian people
People from Sarajevo